Glenn Francis Ong Su Kar (born 22 June 1970) is a Singaporean DJ at SPH Radio's Kiss92, a Singapore English radio station, hosting the morning show with Angelique Teo and Mark Van Cuylenberg (The Flying Dutchman). A radio veteran of over 20 years, Ong has been described as "foul, politically incorrect but refreshingly candid".

Biography
An alumnus of St Patrick's and Siglap Pre-University Institute, Glenn became a full-time DJ at Perfect 10 987FM in 1993, and is also an emcee and voice-over talent for commercials. He hosted radio shows like Say It with Music, ATrax, Top 20 countdown and, in 1995, the hit late-night show called The Ego Trip, which aired every weeknight from 11pm to 2 am.

It was on the Ego Trip that the characters short fart, Simone, The Godfather and the Honky Tong Man were born. He performed all of the voices and soon had a cult following. Known for his wit and mean remarks to callers, the Ego Trip became a controversial, and a much appreciated and discussed late night radio show among students studying at that time of the night.

Ong was once suspended from broadcasting for two weeks by MediaCorp after being fined by the Media Development Authority of Singapore due to inappropriate content on the show, Five Guys And A Girl which he hosted with Rod Monteiro.

Glenn through the years has been involved in TV and movies, he was on Showbuzz, radio TV with Jean Danker, The Dancefloor with the Flying Dutchman, movie wise, he was the radio voice in the film The Teenage Textbook Movie.

In January 2000, Ong married Kate Reyes, another DJ; they divorced by April 2003. Ong then married former FHM girl / 987FM DJ, former Star Sports personality and current Power98FM DJ Jamie Yeo in December 2004. On Friday 13 February 2009, he announced on air that they had 'parted ways'. In June 2011, he announced his upcoming marriage to Jean Danker, another radio DJ in 2012.

Ong's fourth Jack Russell (now in Jamie's care) named Fudge, was born in 2002. On 8 December, Ong announced that he was going on leave indefinitely. Then on the First Friday of the new year, Mediacorp confirmed that Ong had quit with immediate effect. Five days later, Singapore-based F&B hospitality and consultancy firm CIRVIS's managing director Chris Glaessel announced in a press release that Ong was now Director of the company.

In July 2015, six months after Ong left Class 95FM, Glenn joined rival radio station, SPH Radio's One FM 91.3 in the mornings, this time alongside The Flying Dutchman, Andre Hoeden and Elliott Danker. 

In 16 December 2016, Glenn Ong and Jean Danker were married in a seaside solemnisation ceremony at Sofitel Singapore Sentosa Resort & Spa.

Since February 2023, Glenn currently co-hosts 'The Big Show' on Kiss92, weekday mornings from 6 to 10am.

References 

1970 births
Living people
Singaporean Charismatics
Singaporean DJs
Singaporean television personalities
Singaporean people of Chinese descent